Andrey Vladimirovich Nedorezov (born 7 October 1961) is a Russian professional association football manager and a former player.

External links
 

1961 births
People from Zabaykalsky Krai
Living people
Soviet footballers
Russian footballers
Russian football managers
Association football defenders
FC Chita players
Sportspeople from Zabaykalsky Krai